The County of Cardwell is a county (a cadastral division) in Far North Queensland, Queensland, Australia, between Cairns and Townsville. It was named and bounded by the Governor in Council on 7 March 1901 under the Land Act 1897. Its name likely honours Edward Cardwell, who was Secretary of State for the Colonies in 1864–1866 and later served as a reformist Secretary of State for War.

Parishes
Cardwell is divided into parishes, as listed below:

References

External links 

 
 
 
 

Cardwell